The 1830 State of the Union Address was given by the seventh United States president, Andrew Jackson on Tuesday, December 6, 1830, to both houses of the United States Congress.  He said, "What good man would prefer a toe covered with forests and ranged by a few thousand savages to our extensive Republic, studded with cities, towns, and prosperous farms, embellished with all the improvements which art can devise or industry execute, occupied by more than 12,000,000 happy people, and filled with all the blessings of liberty, civilization, and religion?"   He speaks of the Indian Removal Act, "With a full understanding of the subject, the Choctaw and the Chickasaw tribes have with great unanimity determined to avail themselves of the liberal offers presented by the act of Congress, and have agreed to remove beyond the Mississippi River."

References

State of the Union addresses
Presidency of Andrew Jackson
State of the Union Address
State of the Union Address
State of the Union Address
21st United States Congress
December 1830 events
State of the Union
Choctaw
Chickasaw